This page indexes the individual year in film pages. Each year is annotated with its significant events.

 19th century in film
 20th century in film:
 1900s – 1910s – 1920s – 1930s – 1940s – 1950s – 1960s – 1970s – 1980s – 1990s
 21st century in film:
 2000s – 2010s – 2020s

19th century in film

Before Muybridge's 1878 work, photo sequences were not recorded in real-time because light-sensitive emulsions needed a long exposure time. The sequences were basically made as time-lapse recordings. It is possible that people at the time actually viewed such photographs come to life with a phénakisticope or zoetrope (this certainly happened with Muybridge's work). 

 1826 – View from the Window at Le Gras, Nicéphore Niépce takes the oldest known extant photograph.

 1833 – Since 1833 onwards, 'animated films' or rather animated effects began to be made with the use of phénakisticopes, zoetropes and praxinoscopes.
 1865 – Revolving, self-portrait by French photographer Nadar. Around 1865 he produced this series of self-portraits consisting of 12 frames showing different angles of him sitting still in a chair. Except for a smile in 1 frame, not even a fold in his jacket or a single hair seems to change between the different angles. This could be regarded as a predecessor to the chronophotography which Marey and Muybridge started to experiment with more than 10 years later. As the sequence revolves around space rather than time it is even more related to the bullet-time effect popularized by The Matrix about 135 years later. There's no clue if more than one camera was used in the shoot, but it's certainly well-executed.

1870s

 1874 – Passage de Vénus, first precedent of a film. On December 9, 1874, french astronomer Pierre Janssen and Brazilian engineer Francisco Antônio de Almeida using Janssen's 'photographic revolver' photograph the transit of the planet Venus across the Sun. They were purportedly taken in Japan. It is the oldest film on IMDb and Letterboxd.
 1878 – The Horse in Motion, British photographer Eadweard Muybridge take a series of "automatic electro-photographs" depicting the movement of a horse. Muybridge shot the photographs in June 1878. An additional card reprinted the single image of the horse "Occident" trotting at high speed, which had previously been published by Muybridge in 1877. The most famous of these electro-photographs is "Sallie Gardner" taken on June 19, 1878. Railroad tycoon Leland Stanford hired Muybridge to settle the questions of whether a galloping horse ever had all four of its feet off the ground. Muybridge's photos showed the horse with all four feet off the ground. Muybridge went on a lecture tour showing his photographs on a moving-image device he called the zoopraxiscope.

1880s

 1885 – American inventors George Eastman and Hannibal Goodwin each invent a sensitized celluloid base roll photographic film to replace the glass plates then in use.
 1885 – L'homme Machine, directed by French scientist Étienne-Jules Marey. The oldest black and white animated known film.
 1886 – Louis Le Prince is granted an American dual-patent on a 16-lens device that combines a motion picture camera with a projector.
 1887 – Man Walking Around a Corner, directed by French inventor Louis Le Prince. The oldest known film. Although according to David Wilkinson's 2015 documentary The First Film it's not film, but a series of photographs, 16 in all, each taken from one of the lens from Le Prince's camera. Pictures from the film were sent in a letter dated 18 August 1887 to his wife. Le Prince went on to develop the one lens camera and on the 14th October 1888 he finally made the world's first moving image, Roundhay Garden Scene.
 1888 – Roundhay Garden Scene, the earliest surviving film by French inventor Louis Le Prince, is shot in Leeds, West Yorkshire, England, through a groundbreaking 20 frames per second. Others short films made at the same time were Accordion Player and Traffic Crossing Leeds Bridge.
 1889 - Eastman Kodak is the first company to begin commercial production of film on a flexible transparent base, celluloid.

1890s

 1890 - London's Trafalgar Square; Monkeyshines
 1891 - Dickson Greeting; Men Boxing; Newark Athlete
 1892 – Le Clown et ses chiens; Pauvre Pierrot; Un bon bock, first projected animated films released by Émile Reynaud.
 1893 – Blacksmiths, the first film shown publicly on the Kinetoscope, a system given to Edison; Thomas Edison creates "America's First Film Studio", Black Maria.
 1894 – 
Carmencita, according to film historian Charles Musser, directed and produced by William K.L. Dickson, the Scottish inventor credited with the invention of the motion picture camera under the employ of Thomas Edison was the first woman to appear in front of an Edison motion picture camera and may have been the first woman to appear in a motion picture within the United States.
The Dickson Experimental Sound Film made by William Dickson in late 1894 or early 1895 is the first known film with live-recorded sound and appears to be the first motion picture made for the Kinetophone, the proto-sound-film system developed by Dickson and Thomas Edison.  It is also discussed whether it is considered as the first LGBT film. Further in his book The Celluloid Closet (1981), film historian Vito Russo discusses the film, claiming, without attribution, that it was titled The Gay Brothers. Russo's unsupported naming of the film has been adopted widely online and in at least three books, and his unsubstantiated assertions that the film's content is homosexual are frequently echoed. In addition to there being no evidence for the title Russo gives the film, in fact, the word "gay" was not generally used as a synonym for "homosexual" at the time the film was made. A particularly relevant example of the way the word "gay" was actually used is provided by a later Edison Manufacturing Company film, directed by Edwin S. Porter. As described by scholar Linda Williams, The Gay Shoe Clerk (1903).
 1895 – In Paris, France on December 28, 1895, the Lumière brothers screen ten films at the Salon Indien du Grand Café in Paris making the first commercial public screening ever made, marked traditionally as the birth date of the film; Gaumont Film Company, the oldest ever film studio, is founded by inventor Léon Gaumont.
 1896 – L'Arrivée d'un train en gare de La Ciotat, one of the six more short films released by the Lumière brothers; Pathé-Frères is founded.
 1897 – Vitagraph is founded in New York City.
 1898 –The Astronomer's Dream; The Cavalier's Dream; Photographing a Ghost; Santa Claus
 1899 – The Dreyfus Affair and Cendrillon (first screen adaptation of the traditional fairy tale Cinderella) released by Georges Méliès; earliest known use of a colour motion picture film footage by Edward Raymond Turner.

1900s

 1900 – Sherlock Holmes Baffled, Joan of Arc, The Enchanted Drawing
 1901 – Star Theatre, Stop Thief!, Scrooge, or, Marley's Ghost
 1902 – A Trip to the Moon
 1903 – The Great Train Robbery
 1904 – The Impossible Voyage; Titanus is founded
 1905 – Adventures of Sherlock Holmes; or, Held for Ransom
 1906 – The Story of the Kelly Gang, Dream of a Rarebit Fiend, Humorous Phases of Funny Faces; Nordisk Film is founded
 1907 – Ben-Hur, L'Enfant prodigue
 1908 – Fantasmagorie, A Visit to the Seaside, The Taming of the Shrew, The Thieving Hand, The Assassination of the Duke of Guise; first use of Kinemacolor; Pathé News invents the newsreel.
 1909 – The Country Doctor, A Corner in Wheat, Princess Nicotine; or, The Smoke Fairy, Les Misérables; 35 mm film becomes a filmmaking standard across the world.

1910s

 1910 – In Old California, In the Border States, White Fawn's Devotion
 1911 – L'Inferno, Baron Munchausen's Dream, Defence of Sevastopol, The Lonedale Operator
 1912 – Independenţa României, The Musketeers of Pig Alley , Richard III; Universal Pictures and Paramount Pictures, Hollywood's two oldest major film studios, are founded; the British Board of Film Classification is established.
 1913 – The Bangville Police, Fantômas, Barney Oldfield's Race for a Life, Raja Harishchandra; invention of the film trailer
 1914 – Cabiria, The Perils of Pauline, Tillie's Punctured Romance, Judith of Bethulia
 1915 – The Birth of a Nation, The Tramp, Les Vampires, A Fool There Was
 1916 – Intolerance, 20,000 Leagues Under the Sea, Gertie the Dinosaur, The Queen of Spades; invention of Technicolor. 
 1917 – Rebecca of Sunnybrook Farm, A Man There Was
 1918 – Stella Maris, Mickey, Shifting Sands
 1919 – Blind Husbands, Broken Blossoms, True Heart Susie, Dalagang Bukid, Male and Female; United Artists is founded.

1920s

 1920 – The Cabinet of Dr. Caligari, Way Down East, The Flapper, The Mark of Zorro, Dr. Jekyll and Mr. Hyde, The Golem: How He Came into the World, Within Our Gates
 1921 – The Four Horsemen of the Apocalypse, The Kid, The Phantom Carriage, Fool's Paradise, The Sheik, The Mechanical Man
 1922 – Nosferatu, Häxan, Foolish Wives, The Little Rascals, Blood and Sand, Nanook of the North, Dr. Mabuse the Gambler; Motion Picture Association of America is established.
 1923 – Safety Last!, The Hunchback of Notre Dame, Our Hospitality, The Ten Commandments; Warner Bros. Pictures and Walt Disney Pictures are founded; 16 mm film introduced.
 1924 – Sherlock Jr., The Thief of Bagdad, Greed, The Last Laugh, He Who Gets Slapped; Metro-Goldwyn-Mayer and Columbia Pictures are founded
 1925 – The Gold Rush, The Battleship Potemkin, The Big Parade, The Phantom of the Opera, Ben-Hur
 1926 – The General, The Adventures of Prince Achmed, Don Juan
 1927 – The Jazz Singer, Metropolis, Laurel & Hardy, Wings, Sunrise: A Song of Two Humans, Napoléon, The King of Kings
 1928 – The Passion of Joan of Arc, Steamboat Willie, Un Chien Andalou, Lights of New York, The Circus, The Crowd; RKO Pictures is founded
 1929 – Blackmail, Pandora's Box, Man with a Movie Camera, The Broadway Melody, Disraeli, The Virginian; 1st Academy Awards

1930s

 1930 – Looney Tunes, All Quiet on the Western Front, Earth, Journey's End, The Blue Angel, Hell's Angels, The Big House
 1931 – Frankenstein, Dracula, The Champ, The Public Enemy, Little Caesar, Cimarron, M, City Lights, The Front Page
 1932 – Shanghai Express, Scarface, Tarzan the Ape Man, The Mummy, Betty Boop, Freaks, Trouble in Paradise, The Sign of the Cross, Grand Hotel; 8 mm film introduced.
 1933 – King Kong, Fred & Ginger, The Invisible Man, 42nd Street, Duck Soup, The Three Stooges, She Done Him Wrong
 1934 – L'Atalante, It Happened One Night, The Thin Man, Cleopatra, The Goddess, Imitation of Life, Manhattan Melodrama, The Black Cat, Bright Eyes
 1935 – A Night at the Opera, Bride of Frankenstein, The 39 Steps, Mutiny on the Bounty; 20th Century Fox  and The Rank Organisation are founded
 1936 – Modern Times, Swing Time, Mr. Deeds Goes to Town, Flash Gordon, My Man Godfrey, The Great Ziegfeld, Come and Get It
 1937 – Snow White and the Seven Dwarfs, The Life of Emile Zola, La Grande Illusion, Pépé le Moko, The Prisoner of Zenda, Lost Horizon
 1938 – Bringing Up Baby, The Adventures of Robin Hood, Alexander Nevsky, Jezebel, A Christmas Carol, Boys Town, Angels with Dirty Faces
 1939 – Gone with the Wind, The Wizard of Oz, The Rules of the Game, Sherlock Holmes, The Hunchback of Notre Dame, Of Mice and Men, Mr. Smith Goes to Washington, Stagecoach

1940s

 1940 – His Girl Friday, The Great Dictator, Tom and Jerry, Bugs Bunny and Elmer Fudd, Rebecca, Pinocchio, Fantasia, The Grapes of Wrath, The Philadelphia Story, Road to... series
 1941 – Citizen Kane, The Lady Eve, Sergeant York, Dumbo, How Green Was My Valley, Woody Woodpecker, The Maltese Falcon, The Wolf Man
 1942 – Casablanca, Mrs. Miniver, The Magnificent Ambersons, To Be or Not to Be, Bambi, Yankee Doodle Dandy, Cat People, Saludos Amigos
 1943 – Ossessione, The Song of Bernadette, Heaven Can Wait, Phantom of the Opera, The Life and Death of Colonel Blimp, Lassie Come Home, Shadow of a Doubt, For Whom the Bell Tolls, The Ox-Bow Incident, Cabin in the Sky, Droopy
 1944 – Going My Way, Double Indemnity, Meet Me in St. Louis, Ivan the Terrible, Laura, To Have and Have Not, Murder, My Sweet, The Three Caballeros, Gaslight; 1st Golden Globe Awards
 1945 – Brief Encounter, Children of Paradise, Leave Her to Heaven, The Lost Weekend, The Naughty Nineties, Anchors Aweigh, The Picture of Dorian Gray, Rome, Open City, Spellbound, Along Came Jones
 1946 – It's a Wonderful Life, Notorious, My Darling Clementine, Great Expectations, The Best Years of Our Lives, Song of the South, Make Mine Music, Beauty and the Beast, The Big Sleep, Blue Skies; First Cannes Film Festival
 1947 – Miracle on 34th Street, Black Narcissus, The Lady from Shanghai, Fun and Fancy Free, Monsieur Verdoux, Out of the Past, Odd Man Out
 1948 – Bicycle Thieves, The Red Shoes, Red River, Hamlet, Easter Parade, Melody Time, The Paleface, The Treasure of the Sierra Madre; 1st British Academy Film Awards
 1949 – The Third Man, Late Spring, All the King's Men, White Heat, Whisky Galore!, Stray Dog, The Adventures of Ichabod and Mr. Toad, The Heiress, On the Town

1950s

 1950 – Rashomon, Sunset Boulevard, All About Eve, Cinderella, Harvey, Father of the Bride, Orphée, Annie Get Your Gun, In a Lonely Place, Cyrano de Bergerac, King Solomon's Mines, Born Yesterday
 1951 – A Streetcar Named Desire, An American in Paris, The Day the Earth Stood Still, Alice in Wonderland, Quo Vadis, The African Queen, The Thing from Another World, Ace in the Hole, Strangers on a Train, A Place in the Sun, Decision Before Dawn
 1952 – Singin' in the Rain, High Noon, The Bad and the Beautiful, The Quiet Man, Limelight, This Is Cinerama, The Greatest Show on Earth; first 3D films
 1953 – Peter Pan, Tokyo Story, From Here to Eternity, Shane, The War of the Worlds, Ugetsu, The Robe, Trouble in Store, Calamity Jane, The Earrings of Madame de..., Salome, Roman Holiday, The Band Wagon, Gentlemen Prefer Blondes; first use of CinemaScope; British cinema advertisement company Pearl & Dean is founded.
 1954 – Godzilla, Rear Window, Seven Samurai, Dial M for Murder, White Christmas, 20,000 Leagues Under the Sea, Creature from the Black Lagoon, Sansho the Bailiff, A Star Is Born, On the Waterfront, La Strada, Three Coins in the Fountain, Seven Brides for Seven Brothers
 1955 – Rebel Without a Cause, The Night of the Hunter, To Catch a Thief, The Seven Year Itch, Marty, Ordet, Pather Panchali, All That Heaven Allows, Smiles of a Summer Night, Lady and the Tramp, Oklahoma!, Mr. Arkadin, The Court Jester, Mister Roberts, Blackboard Jungle
 1956 – The Ten Commandments, High Society, Carousel, The King and I, Giant, The Searchers, A Man Escaped, Forbidden Planet, Invasion of the Body Snatchers, Night and Fog, Around the World in 80 Days, Wakeful Eyes, Rock Around the Clock, Rock, Rock, Rock!
 1957 – The Bridge on the River Kwai, 12 Angry Men, Sweet Smell of Success, Old Yeller, The Seventh Seal, Touch of Evil, Jailhouse Rock, Let's All Go to the Lobby, Mother India, The Snow Queen, Wild Strawberries, Paths of Glory, Throne of Blood, The Curse of Frankenstein, Back Again
 1958 – Vertigo, Ascenseur pour l'échafaud, Gigi, South Pacific, Cat on a Hot Tin Roof, Carry On, Ashes and Diamonds, Jalsaghar, The Fly, The Blob, Attack of the 50 Foot Woman, Jamila, the Algerian
 1959 – Ben-Hur, Some Like It Hot, The 400 Blows, Shake Hands with the Devil, North by Northwest, Anatomy of a Murder, Sleeping Beauty, Rio Bravo, Pickpocket, Hiroshima mon amour, Pillow Talk, Forbidden Women, Among the Ruins, The Second Man, Imitation of Life

1960s

 1960 – Psycho, Spartacus, Breathless, The Apartment, Exodus, The Magnificent Seven, La Dolce Vita, Money and Women, L'Avventura, Love and Adoration, The Time Machine, A Scrap of Bread, Swiss Family Robinson
 1961 – West Side Story, Breakfast at Tiffany's, Divorce, Italian Style, El Hub Keda, Judgment at Nuremberg, Yojimbo, Last Year at Marienbad, Ana Wa Banati, A Storm of Love, One Hundred and One Dalmatians, The Absent-Minded Professor
 1962 – Lawrence of Arabia, To Kill a Mockingbird, The Man Who Shot Liberty Valance, Dr. No, What Ever Happened to Baby Jane?, Ivan's Childhood, The Manchurian Candidate, Lolita, La Jetée, Sundays and Cybele, Appointment at the Tower, The Cursed Palace, Gay Purr-ee, The Music Man
 1963 – The Birds, The Great Escape, The Pink Panther, Tom Jones, Hud, Cleopatra, Charade, 8½, Not on Your Life, Soft Hands, Lilies in the Field, The Haunting, How the West Was Won, The Nutty Professor, It's a Mad, Mad, Mad, Mad World, The Sword in the Stone, Yesterday, Today and Tomorrow, The Leopard, High and Low, Irma la Douce, Saladin the Victorious, McLintock!
 1964 – Mary Poppins, A Hard Day's Night, Dr. Strangelove, A Fistful of Dollars, Goldfinger, A Husband on Vacation, The Umbrellas of Cherbourg, My Fair Lady
 1965 – The Sound of Music, Doctor Zhivago, The Great Race, Cat Ballou, For a Few Dollars More, Dearer than My Life, Repulsion
 1966 – Persona, The Good, the Bad and the Ugly, Blowup, Fantastic Voyage, Who's Afraid of Virginia Woolf?, Au Hasard Balthazar, The Battle of Algiers, A Man for All Seasons, The Wild Angels, Winnie the Pooh, Alfie, Born Free, My Wife, the Director General, A Wife from Paris, Andrei Rublev
 1967 – Bonnie and Clyde, The Graduate, Playtime, Belle de jour, Cool Hand Luke, In the Heat of the Night, The Jungle Book, Dont Look Back, The Dirty Dozen, The Producers, My Wife's Dignity, Doctor Dolittle, Thoroughly Modern Millie, The Second Wife
 1968 – 2001: A Space Odyssey, Rosemary's Baby, Planet of the Apes, Once Upon a Time in the West, Night of the Living Dead, Stolen Kisses, My Wife's Goblin, Yellow Submarine, The Man Who Lost His Shadow, Oliver!, Chitty Chitty Bang Bang, The Love Bug, Bullitt, Funny Girl, Yours, Mine and Ours
 1969 – Midnight Cowboy, True Grit, Butch Cassidy and the Sundance Kid, Easy Rider, The Wild Bunch, Z, The Color of Pomegranates, The Italian Job, A Boy Named Charlie Brown, Good Morning, My Dear Wife, The Computer Wore Tennis Shoes

1970s

 1970 – Love Story, The Conformist, Performance, Patton, M*A*S*H, Woodstock, The Aristocats, Tora! Tora! Tora!, My Husband's Wife, Five Easy Pieces, Airport, Let It Be; first IMAX films
 1971 – The French Connection, A Clockwork Orange, Willy Wonka & the Chocolate Factory, Dirty Harry, Get Carter, The Last Picture Show, Fiddler on the Roof, Harold and Maude, Straw Dogs, Duel, Shaft, The Killers, Chitchat on the Nile
 1972 – The Godfather, Aguirre, the Wrath of God, The Poseidon Adventure, Cries and Whispers, Those People of the Nile, Solaris, Deep Throat, Pink Flamingos, Snoopy Come Home, Fritz the Cat, What's Up, Doc?, Last Tango in Paris, Le charme discret de la bourgeoisie, Featureless Men
 1973 – The Exorcist, Enter the Dragon, Amarcord, The Sting, American Graffiti, Paper Moon, Mean Streets, The Wicker Man, Belladonna of Sadness, Fantastic Planet, Robin Hood, Charlotte's Web, Distant Thunder, Day for Night, The Other Man, Papillon, Serpico, Badlands, High Plains Drifter
 1974 – A Woman Under the Influence, The Godfather Part II, Chinatown, Ali: Fear Eats the Soul, The Texas Chain Saw Massacre, Benji, Phantom of the Paradise, Young Frankenstein, Blazing Saddles, The Conversation, That's Entertainment!, Black Christmas, The Towering Inferno, In Summer We Must Love
 1975 – Jaws, One Flew Over the Cuckoo's Nest, The Rocky Horror Picture Show, The Passenger, The Guilty, Karnak, Dog Day Afternoon, Nashville, Barry Lyndon, Mirror,  Monty Python and the Holy Grail, Dersu Uzala, Sholay; videocassette recorders appear on mass markets.
 1976 – Taxi Driver, Alice Sweet Alice, Rocky, Network, Carrie, All the President's Men, In the Realm of the Senses, 1900, The Omen, Logan's Run, Bugsy Malone, The Outlaw Josey Wales, The Smurfs and the Magic Flute, Freaky Friday
 1977 – Star Wars, Close Encounters of the Third Kind, The Many Adventures of Winnie the Pooh, Annie Hall, Wizards, Saturday Night Fever, Raggedy Ann & Andy: A Musical Adventure, A Bridge Too Far, The Rescuers, Providence, House, Suspiria, Eraserhead
 1978 – Superman, Grease, Halloween, The Deer Hunter, Dawn of the Dead, Invasion of the Body Snatchers, Midnight Express, Watership Down, The Lord of the Rings, Days of Heaven, Up in Smoke, National Lampoon's Animal House
 1979 – Alien, Apocalypse Now, Mad Max, Kramer vs. Kramer, Monty Python's Life of Brian, The Castle of Cagliostro, Star Trek: The Motion Picture, The Muppet Movie, Stalker, Manhattan, All That Jazz

1980s

 1980 – The Shining, Raging Bull, The Empire Strikes Back, Airplane!, The Blues Brothers, Caddyshack, Ordinary People, Friday the 13th, Fame, Kagemusha, The Elephant Man, 9 to 5, Private Benjamin, Moscow Does Not Believe in Tears, The Gods Must Be Crazy
 1981 – Raiders of the Lost Ark (first Indiana Jones film), Chariots of Fire, Reds, The Evil Dead, On Golden Pond, Pennies from Heaven, The Fox and the Hound, Das Boot, American Pop, Blow Out, Heavy Metal, Arthur, Scanners, Time Bandits, Clash of the Titans, An American Werewolf in London, Escape from New York, I'm Not Lying But I'm Beautifying
 1982 – E.T. the Extra-Terrestrial, Poltergeist, Blade Runner, Tron, Sophie's Choice, Tootsie, Fanny and Alexander, Fitzcarraldo, Gandhi, The Dark Crystal, The Secret of NIMH, Heidi's Song, The Last Unicorn, Star Trek II: The Wrath of Khan, First Blood, Annie, 48 Hrs., Fast Times at Ridgemont High, The Thing, An Officer and a Gentleman, The Peacock, The Plague Dogs
 1983 – Michael Jackson's Thriller, Return of the Jedi, Terms of Endearment, Risky Business, Sans Soleil, L'Argent, The King of Comedy, The Right Stuff, Strange Brew, Monty Python's The Meaning of Life, National Lampoon's Vacation, Scarface, Nostalghia, Flashdance, Trading Places, A Christmas Story; THX sound system is developed.
 1984 – Ghostbusters, This Is Spinal Tap, Amadeus, The Terminator, Gremlins, Nausicaä of the Valley of the Wind, Romancing the Stone, The Karate Kid, Once Upon a Time in America, Paris, Texas, Footloose, Splash, Beverly Hills Cop, A Nightmare on Elm Street, Sixteen Candles, The River, The NeverEnding Story
 1985 – Back to the Future, The Breakfast Club, Out of Africa, The Color Purple, Brazil, Shoah, Ran, Come and See, The Goonies, The Care Bears Movie, Tony de Peltrie, The Black Cauldron, Pee-wee's Big Adventure, Fright Night, A Room with a View
 1986 – Top Gun, Aliens, Blue Velvet, The Sacrifice, Ferris Bueller's Day Off, Platoon, Hannah and Her Sisters, Stand By Me, An American Tail, Castle in the Sky, The Adventures of Milo and Otis, The Transformers: The Movie, Luxo Jr., Crocodile Dundee, Three Amigos, Labyrinth, Flight of the Navigator, Big Trouble in Little China, Short Circuit, GoBots: Battle of the Rock Lords, The Fly, Little Shop of Horrors, The Great Mouse Detective
 1987 – Full Metal Jacket, The Princess Bride, RoboCop, Fatal Attraction, Dirty Dancing, The Chipmunk Adventure, The Brave Little Toaster, Wings of Desire, The Dead, Evil Dead II, The Last Emperor, The Untouchables, Raising Arizona, Wall Street, The Lost Boys, Hellraiser, Predator, Moonstruck, Hope and Glory, Planes, Trains and Automobiles, Empire of the Sun, Lethal Weapon, Mannnequin, Innerspace, Spaceballs, Good Morning, Vietnam, Broadcast News, Babette's Feast. Au revoir les enfants, Masters of the Universe
 1988 – Die Hard, Rain Man, My Neighbor Totoro, Beetlejuice, Akira, Cinema Paradiso, Child's Play, The Accused, Big, Grave of the Fireflies, Who Framed Roger Rabbit, Days of Terror, Moonwalker, The Land Before Time, The Last Temptation of Christ, Dead Ringers, Willow, Elvira: Mistress of the Dark, Heathers, The Naked Gun: From the Files of Police Squad!, The Big Blue, The Bear, Monsieur le Directeur
 1989 – Batman, Do the Right Thing, Driving Miss Daisy, Bill & Ted's Excellent Adventure, A Fish Called Wanda, The Abyss, When Harry Met Sally..., The Little Mermaid (first installment of the Disney Renaissance), Kiki's Delivery Service, Say Anything..., Crimes and Misdemeanors, My Left Foot, Dead Poets Society, Tie Me Up! Tie Me Down!, Field of Dreams, Born on the Fourth of July, Honey, I Shrunk the Kids; first publication of Empire

1990s

 1990 – Home Alone, Ghost, Goodfellas, Close-Up, Dances with Wolves, Edward Scissorhands, Wild at Heart, Total Recall,  Misery, Pretty Woman, Journey of Hope, The Hunt for Red October, Arachnophobia, The Rescuers Down Under, Teenage Mutant Ninja Turtles, Dick Tracy
 1991 – Terminator 2: Judgment Day, The Silence of the Lambs, Beauty and the Beast, JFK, Thelma & Louise, A Brighter Summer Day, Barton Fink, Wicked Game, The Addams Family, My Girl, Point Break, Boyz n the Hood
 1992 – Unforgiven, Reservoir Dogs, Basic Instinct, Aladdin, A Few Good Men, The Player, The Crying Game, Wayne's World, Porco Rosso, FernGully: The Last Rainforest, Indochine, Candyman, Death Becomes Her, The Bodyguard, A League of Their Own
 1993 – Schindler's List, Jurassic Park, The Piano, Groundhog Day, In the Name of the Father, The Nightmare Before Christmas, Philadelphia, Three Colours trilogy, Free Willy, Hocus Pocus, Cliffhanger, Ninja Scroll, Batman: Mask of the Phantasm, Sleepless in Seattle, True Romance, Dazed and Confused, Mrs. Doubtfire
 1994 – The Lion King, Pulp Fiction, Forrest Gump, The Shawshank Redemption, Legends of the Fall, Clerks, Sátántangó, The Swan Princess, Interview with the Vampire, Speed, True Lies, Five-Star Thieves, The Crow, Maverick, Léon: The Professional, Il Postino: The Postman, Three Colours: Red, Ace Ventura: Pet Detective, The Mask, Dumb and Dumber, Through the Olive Trees, Four Weddings and a Funeral
 1995 – Toy Story, Braveheart, Se7en, Apollo 13, Babe, The Usual Suspects, Heat, Bad Boys, 12 Monkeys, Clueless, Mortal Kombat, Casper, The City of Lost Children, Ghost in the Shell, Balto, Jumanji, Leaving Las Vegas, Casino, La Haine, Before trilogy, Sense and Sensibility, Pocahontas, first DVDs released.
 1996 – Independence Day, Fargo, Space Jam, Trainspotting, Jerry Maguire, Mission: Impossible, Scream, Mars Attacks!, Harriet the Spy, That Thing You Do!, Flirting with Disaster, The English Patient, Shall We Dance?, Fly Away Home, Shine, Matilda, Beavis and Butt-Head Do America, James and the Giant Peach
 1997 – Titanic, Men in Black, Gattaca, Good Will Hunting, Boogie Nights, Jackie Brown, Austin Powers, L.A. Confidential, Funny Games, Taste of Cherry, Hana-bi, The Full Monty, Princess Mononoke, Anastasia, Life is Beautiful, The Fifth Element, I Know What You Did Last Summer, Contact, Perfect Blue, Cats Don't Dance
 1998 – Saving Private Ryan, American History X, Shakespeare in Love, The Big Lebowski, Buffalo '66, Little Voice, The Thin Red Line, Pleasantville, Blade, The Prince of Egypt, Antz, Pokémon: The First Movie, Bulworth, The Mask of Zorro, The Truman Show, The Wedding Singer, Fear and Loathing in Las Vegas, Lock, Stock and Two Smoking Barrels, Rush Hour, There's Something About Mary, Run Lola Run, Ring, Waking Ned
 1999 – The Matrix, American Beauty, Girl, Interrupted, The Iron Giant, South Park: Bigger, Longer & Uncut, The Sixth Sense, Fight Club, Magnolia, Notting Hill, Stuart Little, Star Wars: Episode I - The Phantom Menace, The Blair Witch Project, Eyes Wide Shut, Beau Travail, My Neighbors the Yamadas, All About My Mother, American Pie, The Green Mile, Election, The Mummy,  Boys Don't Cry, Office Space, Galaxy Quest, Being John Malkovich

2000s

 2000 – Crouching Tiger, Hidden Dragon, In the Mood for Love, Gladiator, Next Friday, Titan A.E., Billy Elliot, Cast Away, Platform, Memento, Chicken Run, Erin Brockovich, Almost Famous, O Brother, Where Art Thou?, High Fidelity, Meet the Parents, Battle Royale, X-Men, The Emperor's New Groove, Final Destination, Unbreakable, American Psycho, Before Night Falls, The Road to El Dorado, The Patriot, Requiem for a Dream; first digital cinema in Europe by Phillippe Binant.
 2001 – Shrek, The Lord of the Rings, Harry Potter, A Beautiful Mind, The Royal Tenenbaums, Spirited Away,  The Mummy Returns, The Fast & the Furious, Moulin Rouge!, Mulholland Drive, Donnie Darko, Zoolander, Training Day, Black Hawk Down, Final Fantasy: The Spirits Within, Waking Life, Monster's Ball, Ocean's Eleven, Amélie, Bridget Jones's Diary, Jimmy Neutron: Boy Genius, Monsters, Inc.
 2002 – Spider-Man, City of God, Talk to Her, Signs, Chicago, Ice Age, 8 Mile, Minority Report, The Pianist, Russian Ark, The Hours, The Quiet American, Gangs of New York, Star Wars: Episode II – Attack of the Clones, Bowling for Columbine, About a Boy, Frieda, 28 Days Later, Bend It Like Beckham, My Big Fat Greek Wedding, Punch-Drunk Love, Spirit: Stallion of the Cimarron, The Cat Returns, The Ring, Better Luck Tomorrow, Catch Me If You Can, The Bourne Identity, Adaptation, Lilo & Stitch, Treasure Planet
 2003 – Oldboy,  Kill Bill, Seabiscuit, Pirates of the Caribbean: The Curse of the Black Pearl, Finding Nemo, Love Actually, Elf, Lost in Translation, Elephant, A Tale of Two Sisters, Good Bye Lenin!, Monster, Big Fish, Cold Mountain, Bad Santa, School of Rock, Once Upon a Time in Mexico, Mystic River
 2004 – Dodgeball, Eternal Sunshine of the Spotless Mind, Million Dollar Baby, The Incredibles, The Passion of the Christ, Sideways, Hotel Rwanda, Downfall, Friday Night Lights, Kill Bill: Volume 2, The Aviator, Howl's Moving Castle, Ray, Hellboy, Saw, Shaun of the Dead, Team America: World Police, Mean Girls, Napoleon Dynamite, Lemony Snicket's A Series of Unfortunate Events, Finding Neverland, Sky Captain and the World of Tomorrow, The Life Aquatic with Steve Zissou, Anchorman: The Legend of Ron Burgundy; Anti-piracy campaign "Piracy. It's a crime", which features the first line You Wouldn't Steal a Car, first advertised.
 2005 – Caché, The New World, Brokeback Mountain, Batman Begins, The Death of Mr. Lazarescu, A History of Violence, Pride & Prejudice, Zathura: A Space Adventure, Walk the Line, March of the Penguins, Madagascar, Wallace & Gromit: The Curse of the Were-Rabbit, Corpse Bride, Munich, Star Wars: Episode III – Revenge of the Sith, Match Point, Wedding Crashers, Serenity, Robots, Sin City, Charlie and the Chocolate Factory, Good Night, and Good Luck, V for Vendetta, 9, The 40 Year Old Virgin, Capote, The Hitchhiker's Guide to the Galaxy, Crash
 2006 – 300, Pan's Labyrinth, Happy Feet, Children of Men, The Departed,  Dreamgirls, The Lives of Others, The Prestige, Paprika, Apocalypto, The Girl Who Leapt Through Time, The Queen, Borat, Little Miss Sunshine, The Pursuit of Happyness, Monster House, The Devil Wears Prada, Casino Royale, An Incovenient Truth, Over the Hedge, Flushed Away, The Last King of Scotland, Snakes on a Plane, Babel, United 93; First Blu-rays released
 2007 – There Will Be Blood, No Country for Old Men, The Simpsons Movie, Enchanted, I Am Legend, Persepolis, Into the Wild, Juno, Atonement, Superbad, Hot Fuzz, Grindhouse, Trick 'r Treat, Once, Transformers, Bee Movie, Ratatouille, Surf's Up, La Vie En Rose, Knocked Up, Son of Rambow, Sweeney Todd: The Demon Barber of Fleet Street, 4 Months, 3 Weeks and 2 Days
 2008 – Slumdog Millionaire, The Dark Knight, Iron Man, Mamma Mia!, Gran Torino, The Wrestler, Milk, Vicky Cristina Barcelona, Frost/Nixon, Cloverfield, Ip Man, Tropic Thunder,  Kung Fu Panda, Taken, Ponyo, Synecdoche, New York, Waltz with Bashir, Marley & Me, In Bruges, Man on Wire, Revolutionary Road, The Reader, The Curious Case of Benjamin Button, Hancock, WALL-E
 2009 – Avatar, Coraline, Inglourious Basterds, 500 Days Of Summer, Fantastic Mr. Fox, A Serious Man, The Hangover,  District 9, Up In The Air, The Hurt Locker, Precious, The Princess and the Frog, The Blind Side, Star Trek, An Education, In the Loop, Zombieland, Crazy Heart, Angels & Demons, Harry Potter and the Half-Blood Prince, The Lovely Bones, Up, Moon

2010s

 2010 – The King's Speech, The Social Network, True Grit, How to Train Your Dragon, Despicable Me, Black Swan, Shutter Island, Winter's Bone, Piranha 3D,  127 Hours,  Scott Pilgrim vs. the World, The Fighter, Kick-Ass, Diary of a Wimpy Kid, The Kids Are All Right, Blue Valentine, The Karate Kid, Arrietty, Inception, Uncle Boonmee Who Can Recall His Past Lives, Tangled, Megamind
 2011 – The Artist, Bridesmaids, Rango, The Adventures of Tintin, Hugo, Drive, The Intouchables, A Separation, The Tree of Life, The Girl with the Dragon Tattoo, Bad Teacher,  Midnight in Paris, Arthur Christmas, War Horse, Moneyball, Crazy, Stupid, Love,  Diary of a Wimpy Kid: Rodrick Rules, Cowboys & Aliens, Tinker Tailor Soldier Spy, The Help, The Cabin in the Woods, Rise of the Planet of the Apes, From Up on Poppy Hill
 2012 – Life of Pi, Les Misérables, Hotel Transylvania, Argo, The Avengers, The Dark Knight Rises, Lincoln, Django Unchained, Ted, Silver Linings Playbook, The Hunger Games, Pitch Perfect, 21 Jump Street, Magic Mike,  Diary of a Wimpy Kid: Dog Days, Looper, The Master, Beasts of the Southern Wild, Frankenweenie, Ernest & Celestine, Zero Dark Thirty, Iron Sky
 2013 –  The Wolf of Wall Street, Oz the Great and Powerful, Gravity, Frozen, 12 Years a Slave, Bhaag Milkha Bhaag, The Great Beauty, Hansel & Gretel: Witch Hunters, Rush, American Hustle, Bad Words, Man of Steel, Dallas Buyers Club, Inside Llewyn Davis, Her, McFarland USA, The Wind Rises, The Tale of the Princess Kaguya, The Conjuring, Nebraska, Pacific Rim, Carrie, Philomena, The World's End, The Croods, Blue Jasmine, Blue is the Warmest Colour, The Best Man Holiday, The Immigrant, Prisoners
 2014 – Interstellar, Boyhood, Big Eyes, Paddington, The Grand Budapest Hotel, Birdman, The Maze Runner, The Fault in Our Stars, Whiplash, Kingsman: The Secret Service, Annabelle,  The Babadook, American Sniper, Ex Machina, Selma, Edge of Tomorrow, John Wick, Gone Girl, Neighbors, Frank, Foxcatcher, Nightcrawler,  Wild, The Imitation Game, The Theory of Everything, Leviathan, Still Alice, Lucy, The Book of Life, Song of the Sea, When Marnie Was There, Stand by Me Doraemon, Maleficent, Big Hero 6, The Lego Movie, Mr. Peabody and Sherman
 2015 – The Revenant, The Hateful Eight, Spotlight, The Peanuts Movie, The Little Prince, The Martian, Jurassic World, Bridge of Spies, Monster Hunt, Krampus, Anomalisa,  Son of Saul, Baahubali: The Beginning,  The Big Short, Spare Parts, Room, Spy, Carol, Creed, Amy, Straight Outta Compton, Inside Out, The Good Dinosaur, Home, Goosebumps,  The Witch, Minions 
 2016 – La La Land, Hidden Figures, Deadpool, Your Name, Dangal, Train To Busan, Zootopia, Kubo and the Two Strings, Sing Street, Arrival, The Conjuring 2,  Manchester by the Sea, Moonlight, Batman v Superman: Dawn of Justice, Trolls, Hacksaw Ridge, Fences, Lion, The Handmaiden, The Mermaid, Moana, Don't Breathe, In This Corner of the World, I, Daniel Blake, Silence, Hell or High Water, Bad Santa 2, Suicide Squad, Sing
 2017 – The Shape of Water, Get Out, It, Blade Runner 2049, 1922, Dunkirk, Logan, The Disaster Artist, Baby Driver,  Diary of a Wimpy Kid: The Long Haul, I, Tonya, The Silent Child, In a Heartbeat, Lady Bird, Three Billboards Outside Ebbing, Missouri, Call Me by Your Name, Baahubali 2: The Conclusion, Wonder Woman, Girls Trip, Phantom Thread, Annabelle: Creation, Darkest Hour, Justice League, Mary and the Witch's Flower, The Breadwinner, Loving Vincent, Captain Underpants: The First Epic Movie, Despicable Me 3, Coco; The Harvey Weinstein scandal begins.
 2018 –  Bohemian Rhapsody, Ready Player One, Spider-Man: Into the Spider-Verse, The Favourite, Roma (which is released on Netflix), Eighth Grade, Isle of Dogs, A Quiet Place, Hereditary, The Nun, Dragon Ball Super: Broly, Bird Box, The Kissing Booth, Aquaman, Crazy Rich Asians, BlacKkKlansman, Benji, First Man, Green Book, The Grinch, Free Solo, Shoplifters, Peter Rabbit
 2019 – John Wick Chapter 3, Joker, 1917, Terminator: Dark Fate, Parasite, Rocketman, Little Women, The Irishman, The Farewell, Once Upon a Time in Hollywood, Shazam!, Ne Zha, Alita: Battle Angel, Bombshell, Us, Abominable, Ready or Not, The Lighthouse, Marriage Story, Capernaum, Knives Out, Ford v Ferrari, Hair Love (Animated Short film), Dolemite Is My Name, Jojo Rabbit, Booksmart, Richard Jewell, A Beautiful Day in the Neighborhood, Pokémon Detective Pikachu, Klaus

2020s

 2020 – Tenet, Nomadland, Demon Slayer: Mugen Train, Minari, The Eight Hundred, Birds of Prey, Hamilton, Mank, The Invisible Man, Enola Holmes, Da 5 Bloods, The Trial of the Chicago 7, Another Round, Promising Young Woman, The Father, The Willoughbys, Wolfwalkers, Ma Rainey's Black Bottom, The Half of It, Soul, Call of the Wild; due to the COVID-19 pandemic, a number of films shut down production, or are either removed from their originally scheduled releases and moved to new release dates or digital releases.
 2021 – Dune, The Power of the Dog, Encanto, Judas and the Black Messiah, Belfast, The Suicide Squad, The French Dispatch, Cruella, Last Night in Soho, The Mitchells vs. the Machines, Licorice Pizza, Don't Look Up, The Last Duel, Flee, West Side Story, Free Guy, House of Gucci, CODA, King Richard, Tick, Tick... Boom!, The Lost Daughter, No Time to Die, Spencer
 2022 – Top Gun: Maverick, The Batman, The Northman, Enola Holmes 2, Everything Everywhere All at Once, Tár, The Fabelmans,  X, Triangle of Sadness, RRR, Elvis, Nope, Aftersun, The Banshees of Inisherin, The School for Good and Evil, Glass Onion: A Knives Out Mystery, The Woman King, All Quiet on the Western Front, Pearl, She Said, Decision to Leave, Women Talking, Babylon, The Whale, Avatar: The Way of Water, Bullet Train, Blonde, The Bad Guys, Matilda the Musical, Guillermo del Toro's Pinocchio
 2023 – Upcoming release of Wish

See also
 List of cinematic firsts

References

Sources
 The Silent Cinema Reader edited by Lee Grieveson and Peter Kramer
 Movies of the 30s, edited by Jürgen Müller, Taschen
 The Magic of Méliès, documentary by Jacques Mény, special collector's edition DVD, Spain

Film
 

Film
Film